Ali Javadi (born 1953) is an Iranian political Communist activist living in exile.

He is one of the main founders and theoreticians of the Worker-Communism Unity party of Iran. In December 2006, while Javadi was part of the Central Committee for the Worker-Communist party of Iran, he helped establish a faction called "The Worker-Communism Unity." Later, Javadi quit the Worker-Communist party of Iran and worked on developing the aforementioned Worker-Communism Unity party of Iran.

Because of his political activism on various radio and television stations, Javadi is a well-known figure among Iranian communists opposed to the Islamic Republic.

Currently, Javadi is Secretary of the Worker-Communism Unity Party's Central Committee.

He is also both the current head of the Marx Society and current director of the “Center for Prosecuting Islamic Republic officials for their crimes against People.”

Life

Return to Iran and forming “Spark Communist Committee” 
In response to rising social tension in Iran, Javadi and a group of his friends put their education on hold and returned to Iran during the summer of 1977— only a few months before the Islamic Revolution.

During the social movement in Iran, Javadi and his friends formed the “Spark Communist Committee” which had close political ties to a similar group called “Alliance for the Struggle of the Working Class Cause.” He joined social and worker protests first against Muhammad Reza Shah and then against Ruhollah Khomeini's newly found regime. To protect his identity, Javadi used the pseudonym “Reza”.

During this time, Javadi got to know Javad Ghaedi, a member of the “Alliance for the Struggle of the Working Class Cause.” With Ghaedi's help, Javadi wrote his first piece called “Councils: Germinal bases of Revolutionary Government”.

Knowing Mansoor Hekmat and joining CMU 
After studying “Iranian Revolution and the Role of the Proletariat (Theses)” (an early work of Mansoor Hekmat and Hamid Taghvaee), Javadi and the “Spark Communist Committee” became attracted to a group named “Sahand Circle." After Sahand Circle formed its 

"Communist Militias Union” (CMU), Javadi and his peers joined it.

Also during this period, Ali Javadi befriended Mansoor Hekmat who was then using the pseudonym “Bahram”. Javadi first met Hekmat in a behind-the-curtain-meeting featuring Hekmat, Gholam Keshavarz, Javad Ghaedi, and a delegate from the group called “Armdadasdane Zahmatkeshane Khorasan”.

After joining the CMU, Ali participated in worker movements in the east and southeast of Tehran. At the same time, Javadi was officially working as a technician for the “Organization of the Expanding and Reconstructing of Iranian Industry”.

On June 20, 1981, a day associated with the 30 Khordad Event, Javadi took to the streets of Tehran. In a fortunate turn of events, Javadi survived the ensuing persecution. 

Following the violent repression of the Islamic Republic of Iran, Javadi lost his connection with the CMU and put his political activities on hiatus.

Return to the U.S. and working with CPI 
In 1984, Javadi used forged documents to flee from Iran to Europe. Then from Europe, Javadi went to the United States where he continued his higher education studies in the state of Texas. It was during this time that the Communist Party of Iran (CPI) was formed and Ali joined the party. After a while, Javadi became responsible for coordinating some CPI activities in the United States.

Joining and leaving WPI 
When a “Worker Communism Faction” was forming in CPI, he joined this Faction and at this time, with the advice of Mansoor Hekmat, he became the Advisor to Politburo of CPI.

After the Worker-Communist Party of Iran was formed, he was among the first to join it and he was a member of the WPI Central Committee from the very beginning.

Ali Javadi was one of the first contributors to “Radio International” and he was responsible for the Television Activities (NewChannel) of the Worker-Communist party of Iran, which was the first Persian satellite channel with a Communist alternative at the time. He was also a member of the editorial board or director of “Anternasional” (means: International), a paper in Persian.

With the recommendation of Mansoor Hekmat, Javadi started publishing an original quarterly magazine in 1999 called “Porsesh”, which translates to "Question" in English.

In September 2003, Javadi launched a television program called “For a better world” to promote WPI's agenda. “Channel One” broadcasts this program several hours a week. 

Later and with the establishment of “New Channel”, he became the first director of New Channel later he left this position.

Later, he was involved in discussions inside of Worker-Communist party of Iran and built a faction named the Worker-Communism Faction of the main Party and was still a part of the party till the faction decided to leave the main party and build its own party, called Worker-Communism Unity Party of Iran, he is one of the leaders which include; Him, Azar Majedi, Siavash Daneshvar.

Akhare Hafte 

For many months, Javadi published a political periodical called Akhare Hafte in Persian, which translates to "The Weekend" in English. In addition to covering current events, he often wrote about his personal life.

References

External links
Official web site (Mainly in Persian)
Official web site of Worker-Communism unity party of Iran (Mainly in Persian) 

Living people
1953 births
Communist Party of Iran politicians
Worker-communist Party of Iran politicians
Worker-communism Unity Party of Iran politicians
Iranian communists